is a Japanese football player for Tochigi SC.

Club statistics
Updated to 1 March 2019.

1Includes Promotion Playoffs to J1.

References

External links
Profile at Montedio Yamagata

1990 births
Living people
University of Tsukuba alumni
Association football people from Kanagawa Prefecture
Japanese footballers
J1 League players
J2 League players
Shimizu S-Pulse players
Tochigi SC players
Ehime FC players
Montedio Yamagata players
Yokohama FC players
Zweigen Kanazawa players
Association football forwards
Universiade gold medalists for Japan
Universiade medalists in football
Medalists at the 2011 Summer Universiade